Intersport Elverys is a sports store chain in Ireland. Founded in 1847, it is Ireland's oldest sports store. Intersport Elverys sell sports clothes and equipment, both third-party and own brand goods.

History
Elverys was founded in 1847, and is Ireland's oldest sports store. It was taken over by Staunton Sports in 1998, has gone from one store to 46 nationwide since the takeover. The company has over 700 employees.

Products
Intersport Elverys offers equipment and sportswear for Gaelic games, soccer, golf, rugby, basketball and other sports. It also stocks exercise equipment such as treadmills and walkers.

References

External links

Sporting goods retailers
Retail companies of Ireland
Castlebar
Retail companies established in 1847
1847 establishments in Ireland
Golf retailers